Balázs Balogh (born 11 June 1990) is a Hungarian footballer who currently plays as a midfielder for Paks.

Club statistics

Updated to games played as of 15 May 2021.

Honours
Újpest
Hungarian Cup (1): 2013–14

References

External links
 Profile 
 

1990 births
Living people
Footballers from Budapest
Hungarian footballers
Association football midfielders
Empoli F.C. players
U.S. Lecce players
Újpest FC players
Puskás Akadémia FC players
Paksi FC players
Nemzeti Bajnokság I players
Hungarian expatriate footballers
Expatriate footballers in Italy
Hungarian expatriate sportspeople in Italy
Hungary international footballers
Hungary under-21 international footballers
21st-century Hungarian people